S. albus  may refer to:
 Scaphirhynchus albus, the pallid sturgeon, an endangered ray-finned fish species endemic to the waters of the Missouri and lower Mississippi River basins of the United States
 Streptomyces albus, an Actinobacteria species in the genus Streptomyces
 Staphylococcus albus, a Coagulase-negative genus of Gram-positive bacteria

See also
 Albus (disambiguation)